Jeff Todd Jaeger (born November 26, 1964) is a former American college and professional football player who was a placekicker in the National Football League (NFL) for twelve seasons during the 1980s and 1990s.  Jaeger played college football for the University of Washington, and received All-American honors.  In the NFL, he played for the Cleveland Browns, Los Angeles/Oakland Raiders and Chicago Bears.

Early years
Jaeger was born in Tacoma, Washington.  He was a standout kicker for Kent-Meridian High School in Kent, Washington.  Jaeger was not offered scholarships out of high school and chose to walk on the football team at the University of Washington.

College career
At Washington, Jaeger took over for outgoing All-American placekicker Chuck Nelson in 1983 and earned Honorable Mention in the AP's All-America team as a freshman. Jaeger would repeat as an AP honorable mention All-America selection in his sophomore season. Following Jaeger's junior year he was selected as a 2nd Team All-American by Football News. Following his senior season, in which the Huskies went 8-3-1, Jaeger was a consensus All-American, selected as a 1st Team All-American by both the AP and UPI.

Jaeger is still the all-time Washington Husky scoring leader with 358 points.  He held the NCAA record with 80 career field goals until it was broken in 2003 by Billy Bennett of Georgia (Jaeger finished with 21 more field goals than the second leading kicker in Husky history). In his senior season, Jaeger converted 17 of 21 field goal attempts, including six of seven of 40 yards or more, as well as converting 42 of 43 extra point tries.

Professional career
In his rookie season, Jaeger broke all of the Browns rookie scoring records with 75 points despite playing in only ten games. His record for most field goal attempts by a rookie in a game was tied in 2017 by Zane Gonzalez.

Jaeger was voted to his first Pro Bowl in 1991.  He tied the Raiders franchise record for longest field goal with a 54-yarder in 1992 which was tied in 2018 by Sebastian Janikowski. In 1993, he led the NFL in scoring and set a new Raider record with 132 points. That same year he also led the NFL in complete field goals and tied the all-time NFL mark for field goal attempts.  During a game against the Denver Broncos, Jaeger kicked a 53-yard field goal to win the game. His kick was seemingly low and yet managed to cross the uprights. Jaeger led the Raiders in scoring during five consecutive seasons and consistently ranked in the top ten in the league in scoring. Jaeger eventually spent his last years with the Chicago Bears. In 1999, Jaeger injured his hip, and was released, but was then re-signed two days later.

Personal life
Jaeger is married and has two daughters. He also volunteered as a kicking consultant at Eastlake High School.

Career regular season statistics
Career high/best bolded

See also
 Washington Huskies football statistical leaders

References

1964 births
Living people
All-American college football players
American Conference Pro Bowl players
American football placekickers
Chicago Bears players
Cleveland Browns players
Los Angeles Raiders players
Oakland Raiders players
Sportspeople from Kent, Washington
Washington Huskies football players
Players of American football from Tacoma, Washington